Roberto Muñoz Sbert (born March 3, 1968), is a former professional baseball pitcher. He played in Major League Baseball from 1993–2001 for the New York Yankees, Philadelphia Phillies, Montreal Expos, and Baltimore Orioles. Munoz had 11 career wins and one career save, which came on April 7, 1994. Munoz pitched the final 3 innings of a 13-8 Phillies victory over the Rockies to earn the save.

See also
 List of Major League Baseball players from Puerto Rico

References

External links

1968 births
Living people
Albany-Colonie Yankees players
Albuquerque Dukes players
Baltimore Orioles players
Clearwater Phillies players
Colorado Springs Sky Sox players
Columbus Clippers players
Durham Bulls players
Fort Lauderdale Yankees players
Greensboro Hornets players
Gulf Coast Yankees players
Las Vegas Stars (baseball) players
Louisville RiverBats players
Major League Baseball pitchers
Major League Baseball players from Puerto Rico
Montreal Expos players
New York Yankees players
Norfolk Tides players
Ottawa Lynx players
Palm Beach State Panthers baseball players
People from Río Piedras, Puerto Rico
Philadelphia Phillies players
Puerto Rican expatriate baseball players in Canada
Reading Phillies players
Rochester Red Wings players
Scranton/Wilkes-Barre Red Barons players
Macoto Gida players
Puerto Rican expatriate baseball players in Taiwan